Ralph Douglas Doubell AM (born 11 February 1945) is an Australian former athlete, and gold medallist at the 1968 Summer Olympics.

Athletic career
Doubell was born in Melbourne, was educated at Melbourne High School and graduated from the University of Melbourne, where he had come under the tutelage of Austrian-born coach Franz Stampfl.

Doubell's first major international victory in 800 metres was at the World Student Games in Tokyo in 1967 in a time of 1:46.7. His next season (the Olympic season) was severely curtailed by Achilles' tendon injuries, and he was unable to compete for six months prior to the Olympic Games in Mexico City. Doubell, however, was able to recover in time for Mexico City and won the 800 m gold medal, passing the pre-race favourite Wilson Kiprugut of Kenya down the straight to win in a world record equalling time of 1:44.3.

Doubell also won the 800 metres gold medal at the 1969 Pacific Conference Games, in a time of 1:48.0.

Doubell had planned to compete at the 1972 Olympics in Munich, but was prevented from doing so by calf injuries, which brought on his retirement from competitive athletics.

Post-athletic career
After retirement from sports, Doubell enrolled at Harvard Business School. He then worked as a Head of Relationship Management and a Director and Divisional Head of Corporate and Institutional Banking of the Deutsche Bank Group in Australia. He was a Director of Telstra Stadium in Sydney until 2007.

Doubell was inducted into the Sport Australia Hall of Fame in 1985. On 12 June 2006, in the Queen's Birthday Honours List, he was made a Member (AM) of the Order of Australia, for "services to athletics through administrative roles, particularly with Athletics New South Wales, and as a competitor".

References

External links
 
 
 

1945 births
Living people
Australian businesspeople
Australian male middle-distance runners
World record setters in athletics (track and field)
Athletes (track and field) at the 1966 British Empire and Commonwealth Games
Athletes (track and field) at the 1968 Summer Olympics
Athletes (track and field) at the 1970 British Commonwealth Games
Olympic gold medalists for Australia
Athletes from Melbourne
People educated at Melbourne High School
Members of the Order of Australia
Sport Australia Hall of Fame inductees
Medalists at the 1968 Summer Olympics
Olympic gold medalists in athletics (track and field)
Universiade medalists in athletics (track and field)
Universiade gold medalists for Australia
University of Melbourne alumni
Harvard Business School alumni
Olympic athletes of Australia
Medalists at the 1967 Summer Universiade
Commonwealth Games competitors for Australia